Diphenylcyanoarsine, also called Clark 2 (Chlor-Arsen-Kampfstoff 2, being the successor of Clark 1) by the Germans, was discovered in 1918 by Sturniolo and Bellinzoni and shortly thereafter used like the related Clark 1 gas by the Germans for chemical warfare in the First World War. The substance causes nausea, vomiting, and headaches. It can subsequently lead to e.g. pulmonary edema (fluid in the lungs).

See also 
Cacodyl cyanide
Clark 1
Chemical weapons

References 

Chemical weapons
Vomiting agents
Organoarsenic compounds
Pulmonary agents
Phenyl compounds
Nitriles
Arsenic(III) compounds
Substances discovered in the 1910s